Brandon Paul Villafuerte (born December 17, 1975) is a former professional baseball pitcher.  He saw time in the major leagues as a relief pitcher for the Detroit Tigers, Texas Rangers, San Diego Padres and Arizona Diamondbacks.

In 2008, he played in the Florida Marlins organization for the Triple-A Albuquerque Isotopes. In 62 games, he went 7-3 with a 3.50 ERA and 57 strikeouts.

Villafuerte pitched two seasons for the Bravos de Margarita club of the Venezuelan Winter League.

He lives in the Tucson, Arizona area and works as a computer technician.

External links

Venezuelan Professional Baseball League statistics

1975 births
Albuquerque Isotopes players
American baseball players of Filipino descent
American expatriate baseball players in Canada
Arizona Diamondbacks players
Baseball players from Hawaii
Bravos de Margarita players
American expatriate baseball players in Venezuela
Brevard County Manatees players
Capital City Bombers players
Carolina Mudcats players
Charlotte Knights players
Detroit Tigers players
Edmonton Capitals players
Fresno Grizzlies players
Jacksonville Suns players
Kingsport Mets players
Lake Elsinore Storm players
Living people
Major League Baseball pitchers
Oklahoma RedHawks players
People from Hilo, Hawaii
Pittsfield Mets players
Portland Beavers players
Portland Sea Dogs players
San Diego Padres players
Schaumburg Flyers players
Texas Rangers players
Toledo Mud Hens players
Tucson Sidewinders players
Victoria Seals players
West Valley Vikings baseball players